"Don't Take It Personal" is a 1989 single by Jermaine Jackson. The single was Jackson's second and final number one on the U.S. R&B chart. "Don't Take It Personal" peaked at number sixty-four on the Billboard Hot 100 pop chart.

The song was sampled by singer Monica for her similarly titled smash hit "Don't Take It Personal (Just One of Dem Days)".

References

1989 singles
Jermaine Jackson songs
1989 songs
Songs written by David Conley (musician)